Rendezvous Bay Pond, also known as Rendezvous Bay Salt Pond, is a wetland in Anguilla, a British Overseas Territory in the Caribbean Sea. It is one of the territory's Important Bird Areas (IBAs).

Description
The pond is a shallow, 24 ha brackish lagoon near the south-western end of the main island. The substrate is marl on the northern side and sand on the southern. It receives fresh water from rainfall, runoff and a few springs. The pond also receives salt water seepage from the bay through the strip of beach that divides them. It was historically used for salt production. Vegetation around the pond is sparse, except for stands of buttonwood mangroves at its western end. Land at the eastern end is mainly used for livestock grazing.

Birds
The IBA was identified as such by BirdLife International because it supports a small breeding colony of least terns as well as populations of common terns and brown pelicans.

References

Important Bird Areas of Anguilla
Wetlands of Anguilla
Seabird colonies
Lagoons of Anguilla